A1 Ko Sa 'Yo is a 2016 Philippine situational comedy series broadcast by GMA Network. The series premiered on the network's Telebabad evening block and worldwide on GMA Pinoy TV every Thursday from June 2, 2016 to November 24, 2016, replacing the Thursday slot of Love Me, Heal Me.

Series overview

Episodes

References

Lists of Philippine drama television series episodes